Crușeț is a commune in Gorj County, Oltenia, Romania. It is composed of ten villages: Bojinu, Crușeț, Marinești, Măiag, Mierea, Miericeaua, Slămnești, Slăvuța, Urda de Jos and Văluța.

References

Communes in Gorj County
Localities in Oltenia